"State of Shock" is a 1984 single by the Jacksons, featuring frontman Michael Jackson and Mick Jagger. It was written by Jackson and guitarist Randy Hansen. The track was originally sung by Jackson as a duet with Freddie Mercury, and was later slated for the Thriller album in 1982; however, due to differing time schedules, Jackson ended up recording it with his brothers and Jagger instead.

Song information
"State of Shock" was the biggest hit from the Jacksons' Victory album in 1984, reaching number 3 on the US Billboard Hot 100 and number 14 on the UK Singles Chart. The song was originally recorded with Freddie Mercury, as Michael Jackson and Mercury had been working on several tracks at that time (1981–1983), e.g. the unreleased title track "Victory" for the eponymous album and "There Must Be More to Life Than This" from Mercury's Mr. Bad Guy (1985). The final version featured lead vocals by Jackson and Mick Jagger.

In his 1994 book Michael Jackson: Unauthorized, author Christopher Andersen described "State of Shock" as a hard rock song and added that Jagger respected Jackson's work and "eyed the phenomenal success of Thriller with envy." Further, he stated that Arthur Collins, then president of Rolling Stones Records, said that Jagger had become "obsessed" with Jackson and "wanted to know every detail about Jackson's life, his contract with Columbia, how the Thriller singles were selling...". "State of Shock" was the last top ten hit for the Jacksons, as well as their last single to be certified gold. Jagger performed by the song with Tina Turner for their 1985 performance at Live Aid. 

In 2002, a demo of Mercury and Jackson singing "State of Shock" was leaked online. In 2014, William Orbit remixed the Mercury/Jackson version for release on Queen Forever, but the song was not included.

Although having been given a songwriting credit for the song, guitarist Randy Hansen claimed in a 2021 interview with Eddie Trunk that he did not recall having any participation at all in the song and felt that he deserved no credit.

An extended dance mix (5:41) of the song is available as a digitally remastered release.  An instrumental clip of the song appeared on Michael's posthumous album Immortal in 2011.

Personnel
Credits adapted from Victory LP liner notes.

 Music written, composed and arranged by Michael Jackson
 Lyrics by Michael Jackson and Randy Hansen
 Produced by Michael Jackson
 Michael Jackson – lead vocals, background vocals, handclaps, Linn programming
 Mick Jagger – lead vocals
 Jackie Jackson – backing vocals 
 Marlon Jackson – backing vocals
 Johnny Ray Nelson – backing vocals
 David Williams – guitar, bass guitar
 Paulinho Da Costa – percussion
 Bruce Swedien – engineer
 Brent Averil – original 16 track engineer
 Matt Forger – assistant engineer, technical director
 Ollie Cotton – assistant engineer
 Nelson Hayes – project coordinator
 Shari Dub – project coordinator

Parodies

"Weird Al" Yankovic used the song multiple times. It was featured in the "Hooked on Polkas" medley on his 1985 album Dare to Be Stupid and was also performed by industry veteran Harvey Leeds that year in the mockumentary The Compleat Al. The style was later used for the song "UHF" from the 1989 film of the same name.

Charts

Weekly charts

Year-end charts

References 

1984 singles
The Jackson 5 songs
Mick Jagger songs
Male vocal duets
Songs written by Michael Jackson
Song recordings produced by Michael Jackson
American hard rock songs
1984 songs
Epic Records singles